Defending champion Hsieh Su-wei and her partner, Elise Mertens, defeated Veronika Kudermetova and Elena Vesnina in the final, 3–6, 7–5, 9–7, to win the ladies' doubles tennis title at the 2021 Wimbledon Championships. The pair saved two championship points en route to their first major title together.

Hsieh won the title with Barbora Strýcová when the tournament was last held in 2019, but Strýcová retired from professional tennis in May 2021.

By reaching the final, Mertens reclaimed the world No. 1 doubles ranking. Kristina Mladenovic was also in contention for the ranking, but lost in the first round.

Bethanie Mattek-Sands and Samantha Stosur were each bidding to complete the career Grand Slam in doubles, but they lost in the second round and first round, respectively.

Seeds
The top seed received a bye into the second round after their first round opponents withdrew from the tournament.

Draw

Finals

Top half

Section 1

Section 2

Bottom half

Section 3

Section 4

Other entry information

Wild cards

Protected ranking

Withdrawals
Before the tournament
  Amanda Anisimova /  Sloane Stephens → replaced by  Emina Bektas /  Quinn Gleason
  Alizé Cornet /  Fiona Ferro → replaced by a bye
  Danka Kovinić /  Rebecca Peterson → replaced by  Elixane Lechemia /  Ingrid Neel

During the tournament

See also
2021 Wimbledon Championships – Day-by-day summaries

References

External links
 Ladies' Doubles draw
2021 Wimbledon Championships – Women's draws and results at the International Tennis Federation

Women's Doubles
Wimbledon Championship by year – Women's doubles